Margret Buscher (8 February 1938 – 18 April 1991) was a German sprinter. She competed in the women's 400 metres at the 1964 Summer Olympics.

References

1938 births
1991 deaths
Athletes (track and field) at the 1964 Summer Olympics
German female sprinters
Olympic athletes of the United Team of Germany
Place of birth missing
Olympic female sprinters